To li eshchyo budet... is the fourth studio album by Russian Soviet singer Alla Pugacheva released in 1980 by Melodiya.

Album information 
The album consisted in part of new songs, but also included songs from the film The Woman who Sings, recorded in 1977 ("Da","Ty ne stal sudboj" and "Etot mir"), and the song "Chto bylo odnazhdy", which was recorded for the movie 31 June, but was not included in the final version of the film. The record was released with a starting circulation of 12 thousand copies, and its final circulation was 2 million 200 thousand copies.

In 1981 the album was released in Czechoslovakia by Supraphon under the name Alla Pugačova.

Track listing

Charts

References

Bibliography
 

1980 albums
Alla Pugacheva albums
Melodiya albums
Russian-language albums